The PI(4,5)P2 cycle or simply PIP2 cycle (also known as PI cycle in past) is one of the important signalling cascades underlying many cellular functions including GPCR signaling, cytokinesis, endocytosis, and apoptosis.

Signalling steps 

PIP2 cycle involves steps of chemical reactions characterized by various enzymes. First hydrolysis of PIP2 molecules by activated phospholipase C leads to formation of diacylglycerol and inositol trisphosphate. These two are themselves important second messengers. Diacylglycerol further converted into phosphatidic acid (PA) by DAGK enzyme. Furthermore, CDP-diacylglycerol synthetase uses CTP to create cytidine diphosphate diacylglycerol from PA. Generated CDP-DAG then condensed to PI by phosphatidylinositol synthase. This PI is then phosphorylated to PI4P and back to PIP2 via action of PI4K and PIP5K

References 

Cell signaling